Ismail Isakovich Isakov (born 11 June 1950) is a Kyrgyz politician and a Lieutenant General in the Armed Forces of the Republic of Kyrgyzstan.

Early life and education 
Ismail Isakov was born on 11 June 1950 in Sopu-Korgon. In 1973 he graduated from the Tashkent Higher All-Arms Command School and served as commander of a motorized rifle platoon of the Southern Group of Forces. In 1984 he graduated from the Frunze Military Academy. From 1984 to 1995, he went from the chief of staff of the regiment to the first deputy minister of defense of the Kyrgyz Republic. He carried out tasks to strengthen the Tajik-Afghan border as part of the collective peacekeeping forces in the Republic of Tajikistan. In 1996 he studied at the Academy of the General Staff of the Russian Armed Forces. He received the rank of Major General.

Career 
On 26 March 2005 he was made Acting Minister of Defense, and appointed Minister of Defense in September 2005, serving until 26 May 2008, when he was made Secretary of the Security Council of Kyrgyzstan.

Isakov met with U.S. Defense Secretary Donald Rumsfeld in 2005, announcing the U.S. could continue to use the Manas Air Base in support of the war in Afghanistan.

On 10 November 2010 Isakov was sworn into the Supreme Council as a member of the Social Democratic Party of Kyrgyzstan (SDPK)

References

External links

 Biography at Gazeta.kg 
 Biography at Tazar.kg 

1950 births
Living people
Government ministers of Kyrgyzstan
Kyrgyzstani generals
Kyrgyzstani military personnel
Ministers of Defence of Kyrgyzstan

Military Academy of the General Staff of the Armed Forces of Russia alumni
Frunze Military Academy alumni